William Mouncey (born in Kirkcudbright in 1852, died 1901) was one of the founding artists of the Kirkcudbright Artists' Colony. He exhibited numerous works at the Royal Scottish Academy in Edinburgh, the Royal Glasgow Institute, Whitechapel Art Gallery, Carnegie Institute (Philadelphia), and in Dresden. In the last years of his life, his work was exhibited at Messrs James Connell & Sons Glasgow, and this helped to bring his work to the wide attention of the public.

References

External links 
 William Mouncey at Art UK

Scottish painters
1852 births
1901 deaths
19th-century Scottish painters
20th-century Scottish painters
People from Kirkcudbright
Scottish male painters
19th-century Scottish male artists
20th-century Scottish male artists